Symphyotrichum novi-belgii (formerly Aster novi-belgii), commonly called New York aster, is a species of flowering plant. It is the type species for Symphyotrichum, a genus in the family Asteraceae, whose species were once considered to be part of the genus Aster. Plants in both these genera are popularly known as Michaelmas daisy because they bloom around September 29, St. Michael’s Day.

The Latin specific epithet novi-belgii (literally "New Belgium") refers not to modern Belgium, but the 17th century Dutch colony New Netherland which was established on land currently occupied by New York state (as Belgica Foederata was the Latin term for the United Netherlands at the time).

Symphyotrichum novi-belgii grows in abandoned fields and wet meadows in eastern Canada and the northeastern United States.

Gallery

Distribution
New York aster is native to eastern Canada and the eastern United States.

Cultivation
This is the largest group of Michaelmas daisies, with over 1,000 named cultivars. They are valued for their late summer color in shades of blue, pink and white. They are best planted in an open, sunny position, and they are susceptible to fungal infections, especially if conditions are not ideal. The cultivars 'Coombe Fishacre' and 'Fellowship' have gained the Royal Horticultural Society's Award of Garden Merit.

Etymology
The Latin-derived specific epithet novi-belgii means "from New York", which was formerly named Novum Belgium ("New Belgium").

Citations

References

External links
Connecticut Botanical Society: Symphyotrichum novi-belgii

novi-belgii
Flora of Eastern Canada
Flora of the Eastern United States
Garden plants of North America
Plants described in 1753
Taxa named by Carl Linnaeus